Sir Einar Athelstan Gordon Caroe CBE (6 October 1903 – 18 April 1988) was an English grain merchant and broker with the firm of W.S. Williamson and Co., Liverpool. He was born in Blundellsands, Lancashire, and died in Scorton, Lancashire.

Caroe was chairman of the Trustee Savings Banks Association, honorary president of the EEC Savings Bank Group and a director of the Norwich Union Group.. He was Chairman on Minton Limited until its sale to Royal Doulton in 1968.  Caroe was also consul for Denmark and Iceland in Liverpool.

He was appointed a Knight Bachelor in the 1972 New Year Honours.

Family
Caroe married twice, first to Frances Mary Lyon on 6 April 1934 (Mary was descended from Thomas Minton and Colin Minton Campbell) they two sons Charles Frederick Caroe (13 May 1935 to 1 August 2012) and Andrew Minton Caroe (born 1 June 1937). Mary died from polio in 1948.  Athelstan married Doreen Evelen Jane Sandland in 1952 (known as Jane). They had three children Clarissa, John and Patrick. Jane died in Lancaster, 21 April 2003. John died at birth and Patrick in 2014 at the age of 49.

Philately
In his spare time, Caroe was a noted philatelist who was added to the Roll of Distinguished Philatelists in 1972. Athelstan was an able tennis player in his youth competing in mixed double at county level with his wife Mary, no doubt helped by his height (6'5").

References

Signatories to the Roll of Distinguished Philatelists
1903 births
1988 deaths
British philatelists
Fellows of the Royal Philatelic Society London
Philately of Iceland
Grain trade
20th-century British businesspeople
Honorary consuls
Knights Bachelor
Commanders of the Order of the British Empire
English male tennis players
British male tennis players
Tennis people from Lancashire